Rodolphe Scherer (born 11 April 1972) is a French equestrian. He competed at the 1996 Summer Olympics and the 2000 Summer Olympics.

References

External links
 

1972 births
Living people
French male equestrians
Olympic equestrians of France
Equestrians at the 1996 Summer Olympics
Equestrians at the 2000 Summer Olympics
Sportspeople from Nantes